Brandenburg Gate is a world-famous gate on the Pariser Platz in Berlin, Germany.

Brandenburg Gate may also refer to:

 Brandenburg Gate (Kaliningrad), a gate on Bagration street in Kaliningrad, Russia  (formerly known as Königsberg)
 Brandenburg Gate (Potsdam), a gate on the Brandenburger Straße in Potsdam, Germany

 "Brandenburg Gate", the third episode of The Motorola Television Hour, a 1953 US drama anthology television series 
 "Brandenburg Gate", a composition by the Dave Brubeck Quartet from the 1958 album Jazz Impressions of Eurasia
 Brandenburg Gate: Revisited, a 1963 album by the Dave Brubeck Quartet
 "Brandenburger Tor" (song), a song for the Eurovision Song Contest 1990 by Ketil Stokkan
 "Brandenburg Gate", a song from the Metallica and Lou Reed album, Lulu
 "Brandenburg Gate," a song by the band Anti-Flag on its American Spring album